Shulamit Aloni (27 December 1928 – 24 January 2014) was an Israeli politician. She founded the Ratz party, was leader of the Meretz party, Leader of the Opposition from 1988 to 1990, and served as Minister of Education from 1992 to 1993. In 2000, she won the Israel Prize.

Biography

Early life
Shulamit Adler was born in Tel Aviv. Her mother was a seamstress and her father was a carpenter, both descended from Polish rabbinical families. The family migrated to Mandatory Palestine when she was a child, and Aloni grew up in Tel Aviv. She was sent to boarding school during World War II while her parents served in the British Army. As a youth she was a member of the socialist Zionist Hashomer Hatzair youth movement and the Palmach. During the 1948 Arab–Israeli War, she was involved in military struggles for the Old City of Jerusalem and was captured by Jordanian forces. Following the establishment of the state of Israel, she worked with child refugees and helped establish a school for immigrant children. She taught in a school while studying law. After her marriage in 1952 to Reuven Aloni, the founder of Israel Lands Administration, she moved to Kfar Shmaryahu.

Aloni joined Mapai in 1959. She also worked as an attorney and hosted a radio show Outside Working Hours that dealt with human rights and women's rights. She also wrote columns for several newspapers.

Political career

In 1965, Aloni was elected to the Knesset on the list of the Alignment, an alliance of Mapai and Ahdut HaAvoda, and subsequently founded the Israel Consumers Council, which she chaired for four years. She left the Alignment in 1973 and established the Citizens Rights Movement, which became known as Ratz. The party advocated electoral reform, separation of religion and state and human rights and won three seats in the 1973 Knesset elections. Ratz initially joined the Alignment-led government with Aloni as Minister without Portfolio but she resigned immediately in protest at the appointment of Yitzhak Rafael as Minister of Religions. Ratz briefly became Ya'ad – Civil Rights Movement when independent MK Aryeh Eliav joined the party, but returned to its original status soon after. 

Throughout the 1970s Aloni attempted to create a dialogue with Palestinians in hopes of achieving a lasting peace settlement. During the 1982 Lebanon War she established the International Center for Peace in the Middle East. In the run-up to the 1984 elections, Ratz aligned with Peace Now and the Left Camp of Israel to increase its size in the Knesset to five seats. In 1992, she led Ratz into an alliance with Shinui and Mapam to form the new Meretz party, which won 12 seats under her leadership in the elections that year. Aloni became Minister of Education under Yitzhak Rabin but was forced to resign after a year due to her outspoken statements on matters of religion. As Education Minister, she also criticized organized tours by Israeli high school pupils to Holocaust concentration camps on grounds that such visits were turning Israeli youth into aggressive, nationalistic xenophobes, claiming that students "march with unfurled flags, as if they've come to conquer Poland". She was reappointed Minister of Communications and Science and Culture.

After the signing of the Oslo Accords in 1993, Aloni expressed her sentiments that the agreements were a positive turning point on an historic scale: "I feel like on the 29th of November [the date of the United Nations Partition Plan for Palestine]; we did not know then what we were heading for, but we knew we were heading for great days."

After the massacre of 29 Muslims in Hebron, West Bank on February 25, 1994, perpetrated by Baruch Goldstein, Aloni called for the expulsion of Jewish settlers from Hebron.

After the 1996 Knesset election, in which Meretz lost three of its seats, Aloni was ousted from Meretz leadership, with Yossi Sarid being elected to succeed her as leader of Meretz. She then retired from politics.

Last years
In a 2002 interview with American journalist Amy Goodman, Aloni said that charges of antisemitism are "a trick we use" to suppress criticism of Israel coming from within the United States, while for criticism coming from Europe "we bring up the Holocaust."

Aloni was a board member of Yesh Din, an organisation founded in 2005 which focuses on human rights in the occupied Palestinian territories.

Personal life
With her husband, Reuven Aloni, she had three sons:
 Dror Aloni – later mayor of Kfar Shmaryahu and head of Herzliya Hebrew Gymnasium
 Nimrod Aloni – an education philosopher
 Udi Aloni – a film director, writer and artist

Reuven Aloni died in 1988.

Shulamit Aloni Prize 
In 2018, the Shulamit Aloni Prize was established. The prize is awarded by the Shulamit Aloni Foundation, a non-profit organization created by a group of Aloni's family members and leading media and cultural professionals for this purpose. The prize, which bears a monetary award, is bestowed to its recipients each year in the Jaffa Theater (aka The Arab-Hebrew Theater), to creators of cultural works (theater, film, poetry and prose) in both Hebrew and Arabic whose work promotes human rights. Inaugural prize recipients included Rana Abu Fraihah (Arabic Culture Prize), Renana Raz (Hebrew Culture Prize) and Sami Michael (Lifetime Achievement Prize). Additional prize recipients include Ayat Abou Shmeiss for Arabic Culture, and Achinoam Nini for Lifetime Achievement.

Awards and recognition
In 1994, received an honorary PhD in Humanities from Hebrew Union College.
In 1994, received an honorary PhD of Law from Kon-Kuk University.
In 1998, Aloni received a special lifetime award of the Emil Grunzweig Human Rights Award by the Association for Civil Rights in Israel.
In 1999, received an honorary PhD of Philosophy from the Weitzman Institute of Science.
In 2000, she received the Israel Prize, for her lifetime achievements and special contribution to society and the State of Israel.

Published works
 The Citizen and His Country, 1958
Children's Rights in Israel,1964 (Hebrew)
The Arrangement - From a State of Law to a State of Religion, on Relations Between State and Religion, 1970 (Hebrew)
Women as Human Beings, 1976 (Hebrew)
"Up the down escalator" in Sisterhood Is Global: The International Women's Movement Anthology, ed. Robin Morgan, 1984.
Democracy in Shackles (Demokratia be'azikim), Am Oved 
Israel: Democracy or Ethnocracy? published in 2008

See also
List of Israel Prize recipients

References

External links

1928 births
2014 deaths
20th-century Israeli lawyers
20th-century Israeli military personnel
20th-century Israeli women politicians
Alignment (Israel) politicians
Asian democratic socialists
Hashomer Hatzair members
Israel Prize for lifetime achievement & special contribution to society recipients
Israel Prize women recipients
Israeli activists
Israeli female military personnel
Israeli Jews
Israeli Labor Party politicians
Israeli people of Polish-Jewish descent
Israeli prisoners of war
Israeli schoolteachers
Israeli women activists
Israeli women lawyers
Israeli women's rights activists
Jewish Israeli politicians
Jewish military personnel
Jewish socialists
Jewish women politicians
Leaders of the Opposition (Israel)
Members of the 6th Knesset (1965–1969)
Members of the 8th Knesset (1974–1977)
Members of the 9th Knesset (1977–1981)
Members of the 10th Knesset (1981–1984)
Members of the 11th Knesset (1984–1988)
Members of the 12th Knesset (1988–1992)
Members of the 13th Knesset (1992–1996)
Meretz leaders
Ministers of Communications of Israel
Ministers of Culture of Israel
Ministers of Education of Israel
Ministers of Science of Israel
Palmach members
Politicians from Tel Aviv
Ratz (political party) politicians
Women government ministers of Israel
Women members of the Knesset
Ya'ad – Civil Rights Movement politicians
Zionists
Jewish women activists